"Gosh" is a song by English electronic music producer Jamie xx, released as a single on 4 May 2015.

Release
On 25 March 2015, Jamie xx premiered "Gosh" and "Loud Places" on Annie Mac's BBC Radio 1 show.

Music videos 
The official music video for "Gosh" was released on 27 April 2015 through YouTube. It was directed by Erik Wernquist. The music video depicts the terraforming and colonization of Mars over the course of time, ending on a fully terraformed planet.

Second music video 
A second music video, directed by Romain Gavras, was released on 1 July 2016 on Apple Music. It was uploaded to YouTube on 4 October 2016. The video was filmed around the Eiffel Tower replica of the Tianducheng housing estate in the city of Hangzhou, Zhejiang Province in China, and it features the actor Hassan Koné and 400 pupils from the Xiaolong Martial Arts School. Upon its release, the video was met with universal acclaim.

Accolades
{| class=wikitable
|-
! Year !! Award !! Category !! Result
|-
| rowspan=7|2016
| rowspan="5" | UK Music Video Awards
| Video of the Year
| 
|-
| Best Alternative Video 
| 
|-
| Best Color Grade 
| 
|-
| Best Styling 
| 
|-
| Best Cinematography
| 
|-
| Camerimage
| Best Music Video 
| 
|-
| Rober Awards Music Poll
| Best Promo Video 
| 
|-
| rowspan=8|2017
| Berlin Music Video Awards
| Best Cinematography
| 
|-
| rowspan=3|Cannes Lions International Festival of Creativity
| Gold Lion for Cinematography
| 
|-
| Silver Lion for Production Design / Art Direction 
| 
|-
| Silver Lion for Direction
| 
|-
| rowspan=3|D&AD Awards
| Best Music Video
| style="background:#ffbf00; text-align: center;"| Yellow Pencil
|-
| Best Direction
| style="background:#8a8b89; color: white; text-align: center;"| Graphite Pencil
|-
| Best Cinematography
| style="background:#8a8b89; color: white; text-align: center;"| Graphite Pencil
|-
| Grammy Awards
| Best Music Video
| 
|-

Release history

References

External links
"Gosh" music video
"Gosh" music video (Version 2)

2015 singles
2015 songs
Jamie xx songs
Songs written by Jamie xx
Young Turks (record label) singles